TRAX is a light rail system in the Salt Lake Valley of Utah, in the United States, serving Salt Lake City and many of its suburbs throughout Salt Lake County. The official name of Transit Express  is rarely, if ever, used. The system is operated by the Utah Transit Authority (UTA). All TRAX trains are electric, receiving power from overhead wires.

TRAX has 50 stations on three lines. The Blue Line provides service from Downtown Salt Lake City to Draper. The Red Line provides service from the University of Utah to the Daybreak Community of South Jordan. The Green Line provides service from Salt Lake City International Airport to West Valley City.

Operations

Service characteristics 
TRAX operates seven days a week, with the exception of some holidays. It operates Monday through Friday from approximately 4:30 am to 11:30 pm with a fifteen-minute headway on each line during the entirety of operating hours. It operates weekends from approximately 5:00 am to nearly midnight with a thirty-minute headway.

Lines and stations

Rolling stock 
117 active railcars
 23 Siemens SD-100 LRVs (1001–1023) built 1998
 17 Siemens SD-160 LRVs (1024–1040) built 2001–2003
 77 Siemens S70 LRVs (1101–1177) built 2010–2012
29 UTDC LRVs (1041-1069) were purchased second-hand from the Santa Clara VTA in 2004 and refurbished for service on TRAX. These were withdrawn from service in 2018.

To handle the increased crowds during the 2002 Winter Olympics, 29 Kinki Sharyo LRVs were borrowed from the Dallas Area Rapid Transit (DART) between 2001 and 2003.

Varying based on projected ridership, the Blue Line typically operates 3-4 car trains, the Green Line 2-3 car trains, and the Red Line 2-4 car trains.

History 
The first line, running from downtown Salt Lake City south to Sandy, was completed in 1999. The second line from downtown to the University of Utah was completed in 2001 and extended in 2003. An extension to the Salt Lake City Intermodal Hub was completed in April 2008. In August 2011, two extensions to South Jordan and West Valley City were completed. With the opening of these two extensions in 2011, the TRAX lines were renamed as colors instead of destinations, with the Blue Line running from the Salt Lake City Intermodal Hub to Sandy, the Red Line running from the University of Utah Medical Center to the Daybreak community in South Jordan, and the Green Line running from the intermodal hub to the West Valley Intermodal Hub.

In 2013 the Green Line was realigned slightly north and away from the Salt Lake City Intermodal Hub, allowing for the opening of the extension to the Salt Lake City International Airport. Several months later, in August 2013, the Blue Line was extended further south to Draper (which opened August 18, 2013). The extensions to South Jordan, West Valley City, Draper, and the Airport were funded in part by a Salt Lake County sales tax increase that would pay for all four of the proposed TRAX extensions. A letter of intent signed with the Federal Transit Administration on September 24, 2007 secured the remaining funding for the light rail lines.

Both the University Line and its extension to the University Medical Center were completed ahead of schedule. A daily ridership of 15,000 was expected for the initial  line in 1999. By the beginning of 2008, the expanded system of  served an estimated 40,000 passengers each day. Ridership for the fourth quarter of 2012 was reported to be at 60,600, making it the ninth-busiest light rail system in the United States of America.

Light rail in the Salt Lake Valley was first seriously discussed in the late 1980s to provide an alternative to traffic congestion on I-15, but the idea was met with criticism. On October 10, 1988, Congress approved $5 million in funds to preserve land along the proposed light rail corridor. Funding for the light rail line, however, remained uncertain. After Salt Lake City won the bid for the 2002 Winter Olympics in 1995, UTA used the city's host status to accelerate obtaining funding through the Federal Transit Administration (FTA). Construction began in 1997. Protesters at the groundbreaking insisted light rail would be dangerous and a waste of money. Public opinion remained divided and businesses on Main Street in downtown Salt Lake City suffered during the construction period.

After the north-south line opened in late 1999 with sixteen stations, ridership expectations were quickly met. The system was enthusiastically embraced by valley residents, to the surprise of many, and once-skeptical communities soon began clamoring for extensions.

Funding for the University Line to Rice-Eccles Stadium allowed it to be completed in 2001 with four new stations, ahead of schedule and the Olympics. An extension to the University Medical Center that added three new stations was completed on September 29, 2003, fifteen months ahead of schedule.  An infill station at 900 South in Salt Lake City was constructed in 2005, and a second infill station, at 9400 South in Sandy (Sandy Expo), opened in August 2006. On December 13, 2006, the UTA Board of Trustees voted to change the name of the station next to the Delta Center to "Arena" in response to the renaming of the nearby indoor arena to EnergySolutions Arena.

On February 23, 2006, plans for extending the main line westward to the current Salt Lake City Intermodal Hub near the Gateway were approved. Two stations were built near the Gateway, as well as one at the Salt Lake Central Station (Salt Lake Intermodal Hub). They opened in April 2008, bringing the total number of stations to 28.

UTA has two service centers for TRAX maintenance: the Lovendahl Rail Service Center, which is just off the Red Line in Midvale, southwest of its junction with the Blue Line, and the Jordan River Service Center, which is just off the Green Line northeast of River Trail. The Lovendahl building was originally an old warehouse for ZCMI, which had recently ceased operations and was renovated into a rail service center in 1999. The Jordan River Center was similarly repurposed from former warehouse around the time of the Red and Green lines opening in 2011, it was also built to handle UTA's brand new Siemens S70 LRV's. The Salt Lake City Southern Railroad (a subsidiary of the Utah Railway) and the Savage Bingham & Garfield Railroad both operate freight service over TRAX tracks via trackage rights.

An additional infill station, 600 South Main Street in Salt Lake City, along all three lines, opened on July 26, 2022. The station was part of the initial plans for the system, but the demand wasn't at the level needed for a station until recently.

FrontLines 2015 
On September 21, 2006, a property tax hike proposal was replaced with a general transportation quarter-cent sales tax hike that was voted on and approved on November 7 of that year. On December 21, 2006, the Salt Lake County Council created a priority list for the sales tax, saying TRAX and commuter rail should take priority. A letter of intent signed with the Federal Transit Administration on September 24, 2007 secured the remaining $500 million in funding for the light rail lines. These funds were used to finance the FrontLines 2015 expansion project, which added four TRAX extensions by 2015 (as well as an expansion to FrontRunner commuter rail).

In order to support planned TRAX expansion, UTA ordered 77 Siemens S70 light rail vehicles from Siemens AG. It is the company's largest light rail contract in the United States to date.

In 2008, construction began on two new extensions: one extension of  through West Valley City (now part of the Green Line) and another extension of  through the southwest portion of the Salt Lake Valley (now part of the Red Line). Both extensions were debuted in ceremonial openings on August 2, 2011, and permanently opened for regular service on August 7. Both extensions were completed ahead of schedule and under budget. Upon completion of these expansions UTA adopted a color-code line names in place of their old destination-based line names.

After the first year of operation, ridership on these portions of the Green and Red lines was less than was projected by UTA.  However, UTA has stated the projected ridership was for the year 2015.  Since these lines were opened for service years earlier than originally planned, the anticipated growth on the west side of Salt Lake Valley has just not happened, yet.  UTA affirms that by 2015 ridership will meet the original projections.

A line from Salt Lake City International Airport to the University of Utah was in the original plans for the system to be completed before the 2002 Winter Olympics, but funding shortages only allowed the eastern portion to be constructed. The airport line eventually came to fruition, however, and ground was broken on October 22, 2008. The extension opened on April 14, 2013, adding  and six additional stations to the Green Line, including a transfer station to the FrontRunner.

On November 14, 2006, the Draper City Council approved the TRAX extension into that city. Neighbors in the area have continually fought the route suggested by UTA. The route follows an old rail line and UTA already owned the right of way. An alternative route that would run down the middle of State Street was also studied by UTA. Use of the UTA right of way for the line was challenged in court and later approved by the Utah Supreme Court on July 12, 2008. UTA published a draft Environmental Impact Statement for the new line that names the UTA right of way as the preferred route. The extension's first phase, which includes  and three new stations, opened on August 18, 2013.

FrontRunner 

When FrontRunner (UTA's commuter rail train) started running on April 26, 2008, the only transfer station between the FrontRunner and TRAX was Salt Lake Central (Salt Lake Intermodal Hub), with the FrontRunner running north from that station to Ogden. However, with the opening of the FrontRunner South extension on December 10, 2012, with service south to Provo, Murray Central was added as second transfer station which allowed for transfer to the Blue and Red lines. Although not part of the FrontRunner South extension, FrontRunner service at the new North Temple Bridge/Guadalupe station also began on the same day. When the Airport extension of the Green Line opened for service on April 14, 2013, this station became the third transfer station between FrontRunner and TRAX. The FrontRunner portion of this station was built to provide a transfer station between FrontRunner and the Green Line, since the reroute of the Green Line for the Airport extension would have left the Green Line without any common station with FrontRunner.

S Line 

For several years a TRAX spur into the Salt Lake City neighborhood of Sugar House had been contemplated. A series of community meetings were held in Sugar House as part of a larger transit study undertaken by UTA. Several transit alternatives were presented to the neighborhood, including bus rapid transit, light rail, and a streetcar. The streetcar seemed to be the preferred alternative. On October 20, 2010, the S Line (known then as Sugar House Streetcar) received a $26 million federal grant that allowed the street car to be completed in less than two years. It used an existing rail line running along 2200 South from the Central Pointe TRAX Station to approximately 1100 East, near the primary Sugar House shopping district.  The first phase of the S Line opened on December 8, 2013.

Planned expansion projects 
UTA has ordered a Draft Environment Study Report for transit alternatives in southern Davis County, including more comprehensive bus service, streetcar lines, and a TRAX line. Some residents opposed UTA's proposal to bring light rail to southern Davis County. In conjunction with the Mountain View Corridor project, there are also plans to build a TRAX line on the west side of the Salt Lake Valley along 5600 West (in the same general area as the Mountain View Corridor). The western line is anticipated to replace the yet-to-be-built 5600 West BRT bus rapid transit (BRT) line.

In 2015, UTA announced plans to eventually expand the Red line. The current proposal would have extension travel south to Herriman, and then turn eastbound, passing through Riverton and terminating in Draper.

Following the completion of the FrontLines 2015 project, UTA has stated they intend to focus on lower-cost projects such as streetcars and bus rapid transit. However, they do intend to extend main TRAX lines. In addition to the aforementioned expansions, they also plan to extend the Blue Line from Draper to Lehi and eventually Orem. They are also exploring the possibility of mass transit to the ski resorts and Park City.

Commercial advertising restrictions 
UTA does not sell naming rights for its stations, nor does it allow stations to be named after commercial businesses. Commercial advertising on TRAX platforms is prohibited, in order for the passengers to be able to notice the safety information. One exception to this rule occurred during the 2002 Winter Olympics. Since, for security reasons, the Arena and Temple Square stations were closed, UTA allowed Coca-Cola to use the area of the unused Arena Station as part of its pin-trading center. The advertising restriction does not apply to the sides of the TRAX train cars or to UTA's buses. Not only does UTA have advertising signs on the sides and rear of many of its buses, it also has many buses where the painting scheme of the full rear or even the entire bus is an advertisement (bus wrap).

Ridership

See also 
Utah Transit Authority
Transportation in Salt Lake City
FrontRunner – commuter rail system
S Line (formerly known as Sugar House Streetcar)
List of tram and light rail transit systems

Notes

References

General

APTA Statistics

External links 

Utah Transit Authority official website
TRAX official website
Utah Rails, timeline of UTA Trax project

1999 establishments in Utah
Electric railways in Utah
Light rail in Utah
Railway lines opened in 1999
Transportation in Salt Lake County, Utah
Utah railroads
750 V DC railway electrification